Duchess Frederica of Württemberg (27 July 1765 – 24 November 1785) was a daughter of Frederick II Eugene, Duke of Württemberg and Friederike Dorothea of Brandenburg-Schwedt.

Life

Frederica was born on 27 July 1765 in Treptow an der Rega, Farther Pomerania (now Trzebiatów, Poland) as the seventh child and second daughter of Frederick II Eugene, Duke of Württemberg and Friederike Dorothea of Brandenburg-Schwedt.
She was the sibling of King Frederick of Württemberg, Sophia Dorothea, Empress of Russia, and Elisabeth, Archduchess of Austria.

On 6 June 1781, Frederica married Prince Peter Frederick of Holstein-Gottorp. The marriage was meant to strengthen relations between Russia and Württemberg (Frederica's sister Sophia Dorothea was married to Paul I of Russia, a member of the House of Holstein-Gottorp). Her sister Sophia Dorothea encouraged the marriage, and her brother-in-law Paul I became the godfather of her sons.

Death
At the age of twenty, Frederica died from childbirth in Vienna on 24 November 1785. She also suffered from breast cancer at the time of her death. Her widowed husband Peter never remarried. He would succeed his cousin William as Grand Duke of Oldenburg in 1823, many years after Frederica's death.

Issue

Ancestry

References

External links

Deaths in childbirth
Duchesses of Württemberg
House of Oldenburg in Oldenburg
1765 births
1785 deaths
People from Trzebiatów
People from the Province of Pomerania
House of Holstein-Gottorp
German Lutherans
Burials at the Ducal Mausoleum, Gertrudenfriedhof (Oldenburg)
Daughters of monarchs